Jessica Heims (born 11 December 1998) is an American Paralympics athlete who competes in discus throw events. 

Heims was born with amniotic band syndrome and had her left leg amputated below the knee aged one year old. She is currently the world record holder in the discus throw in her sports category.

References

1998 births
Living people
Sportspeople from Cedar Rapids, Iowa
Paralympic track and field athletes of the United States
American female discus throwers
Athletes (track and field) at the 2016 Summer Paralympics
Medalists at the 2019 Parapan American Games
Track and field athletes from Iowa
Northern Iowa Panthers women's track and field athletes